Akim Achiase Senior High School is a second cycle co-educational institution located in Akim Achiase in the Achiase District, near  Akim Oda in the Eastern Region of Ghana. The school has its motto in the Akan language reading "Nsiye Bu Mmusu Abasa Mu"  which means Perseverance Conquers Difficulties.  It has the nickname of ACHISEC. Old students of Achisec have an association called OSAASSS formed to support the development of the school. Achisec can boast of their powerful cadet because they are situated in the same town with Ghana Army's Jungle Warfare School named, Seth Anthony  Barracks. The colours of their school uniforms include blue, yellow and green. The school currently offers the following courses: General Science, Business, General Arts, General Agriculture, Home Economics and Visual Arts.

History 
The school was established in 1983 by a Methodist church of Ghana missionary school.

Headmasters 

 Eric Amoah - 2019 till date
 Alex Badji- 2017 to 2019
 Frank Yao Dzamaklu
 Kofi Acheampong

References 

High schools in Ghana
Education in the Eastern Region (Ghana)
Mixed schools in Ghana
Educational institutions established in 1983
1983 establishments in Ghana